Brasso is a metal polish designed to remove tarnish from brass, copper, chrome and stainless steel. It is available either directly as a liquid or as an impregnated wadding pad.

History
Brasso originated in Britain in about 1905. Reckitt & Sons' senior traveller, W. H. Slack, visited the company's Australian branch, where he discovered such a product in use. Samples from Australian and US producers were then analysed by Reckitt's chemists, and by 1920 liquid polish under the trademark "Brasso" was being sold, initially to railways, hospitals, hotels, and large shops.

Because of the hydrocarbon components in the mixture it had a flash point of 72 °F (22 °C) (Abel Close test) and so was classed by railway companies as dangerous goods. This classification allowed the railway companies to charge more for distributing Brasso around the country. Reckitt's appealed to the companies asking for the polish to be recategorized in the hope of reducing costs, but the railways disagreed. As a result of this in 1913 the case was taken to the Railway and Canal Commissioners for a decision. After a hearing lasting two days the commissioners decided in favour of the railway companies, and Brasso remained classed as a dangerous substance for the purposes of railway transport.

The polish grew in popularity in Britain, becoming widely available, eventually replacing the previous paste-style polishes. It has undergone very few changes in either composition or package design over the past century. Cans are often collected as a typical example of classic British advertising design.

In the US, the current Brasso product is not the same as the legacy product. The manufacturer, Reckitt Benckiser, has not produced the impregnated wadding version of the product for many years. The formula changed in 2008 to comply with US volatile organic compounds law, and the metal bottle was replaced by a plastic one.

In 2010, Brasso brought out a new product, Brasso Gadgetcare. Gadgetcare is a versatile, non-abrasive gel that can be used on everything from LCD TV screens, laptop screens, computers, smart phones, and PDAs. The plastic bottle is 50ml and is sold with a microfibre cloth.

Ingredients
The label of Australian Brasso lists "Liquid Hydrocarbons 630g/L; Ammonia 5g/L", whereas the material safety data sheet for Brasso in North America lists: isopropyl alcohol 3–5%, ammonia 5–10%, silica powder 15–20% and oxalic acid 0–3% as the ingredients. However, the Australian version contains kaolin instead of silica for abrasives.

The online data sheet for Brasso wadding in the UK lists the ingredients as C8–10 Alkane/Cycloalkane/Aromatic Hydrocarbons, Quartz, C14–18 and C16–18 unsaturated Fatty acids, Kaolinite, Aqua, Ammonium Hydroxide and Iron Hydroxide. Brasso liquid lists a slightly different mix; C8–10 Alkane/Cycloalkane/Aromatic Hydrocarbons, Quartz, Kaolin, C12–20 Saturated and Unsaturated Monobasic Fatty Acids, Aqua and Ammonium Hydroxide. Also available are ingredients in a discontinued recipe for Brasso. Wadding: C8–10 Alkane/Cycloalkane/Aromatic Hydrocarbons, Quartz, Ammonium Tallate and Colorant. Liquid: C8–10 Alkane/Cycloalkane/Aromatic Hydrocarbons, Quartz, Kaolin and Ammonium Tallate.

Brasso is abrasive and will wear metal over time. The National Trust recommend alternative cleaners.

Other applications 
Brasso has also been used to polish out scratches in plastics:
It has been used to polish CDs, DVDs, screens, and pools to repair scratches. It is a mild solvent and an extremely fine abrasive, so when applied to the reflective surface of the disc and rubbed radially (in straight lines between the edge and centre), it can smooth scratches and reduce their effect.
Brasso has been used on Lego minifigures to remove markings.
Brasso has been used by watch enthusiasts to polish scratches out of acrylic crystals on watches.

Brasso has been successfully used to take minor (white) heat marks out of French polished wooden surfaces. The fine abrasive cuts through the surface and allows the solvent into the wax and lacquer layer. The surface should be properly cleaned and waxed after this treatment.

Brasso has been successfully used to restore Bakelite (telephones, appliances, etc.).

Brasso, on account of its ammonia content, has been used as a de-coppering agent in rifle barrels to remove copper fouling.

See also
 List of cleaning products
 "Shine Your Buttons with Brasso", a bawdy popular song

Notes

External links

Brasso Gadgetcare Review
Brasso Product Safety Leaflet

British brands
Cleaning product brands
Reckitt brands
British Royal Warrant holders